Hypsiprymnodon karenblackae is a fossil species describing a small marsupial extant in Australia during the Early to Middle Miocene Epoch. The material was collected at the Australian Fossil Mammal Sites (Riversleigh). The taxon was published in 2014, along with several other new species of the genus Hypsiprymnodon, known as musky rat-kangaroos. The morphology of the teeth suggest it existed in a wet rainforest environment, similar to the ecological conditions of the extant species, the musky rat-kangaroo (Hypsiprymnodon moschatus). The type specimen was collected at the Camel Sputum site, classified as a Faunal Zone B (Miocene) deposit at Riversleigh in northwestern Queensland, The epithet is for Dr. Karen Black's contribution to palaeontology in Australia, especially the Riversleigh fossils.

References

Miocene mammals of Australia
Fossil taxa described in 2014
Macropods